Caffè latte, often shortened to just latte in English, is a coffee beverage of Italian origin made with espresso and steamed milk. Variants include the chocolate-flavored mocha or replacing the coffee with another beverage base such as masala chai (spiced Indian tea), mate, matcha, turmeric or rooibos; alternatives to milk, such as soy milk or almond milk, are also used.

In northern Europe and Scandinavia, the term café au lait has traditionally been used for the combination of espresso and milk. In France,  is from the original name of the beverage (caffè latte); a combination of espresso and steamed milk equivalent to a "latte" is in French called  and in German .

Origin and history 

Coffee, which was adopted from the Ottoman empire, and milk have been part of European cuisine since the seventeenth century. Public cafés in Europe and the USA seem to have no mention of the terms until the twentieth century, although Kapuziner is mentioned in Austrian coffee houses in Vienna and Trieste in the second half of 1700s as "coffee with cream, spices, and sugar" (being the origin of the Italian cappuccino).

According to the Oxford English Dictionary, the term caffè e latte was first used in English in 1867 by William Dean Howells in his essay "Italian Journeys". Kenneth Davids maintains that "...breakfast drinks of this kind have existed in Europe for generations, but the (commercial) caffè version of this drink is an American invention". The French term  was used in cafés in several countries in western continental Europe from 1900 onward, however, the term café crème was used in France for coffee with milk or cream. 

The Austrian-Hungarian empire (Central Europe) had its own terminology for the coffees being served in coffee houses, while in German homes it was still called . The Italians used the term caffè latte domestically, but it is not known from cafés such as Florian in Venice or any other coffee houses or places where coffee was served publicly. Even when the Italian espresso bar culture bloomed in the years after WWII both in Italy, and in cities such as Vienna and London, espresso and cappuccino are the terms used and latte is missing on coffee menus of that time.

In Italian,  means "milk"—so ordering a "latte" in Italy will get the customer a glass of milk.

In Spanish, the phrase  (coffee with milk) is used, which is by default served in a medium or large cup whereas the similar cortado (coffee with less milk) is served in a small cup.

The Caffe Mediterraneum in Berkeley, California claims that one of its early owners, Lino Meiorin, "invented" and "made the latte a standard drink" in the 1950s. The latte was popularized in Seattle, Washington in the early 1980s  and spread more widely in the early 1990s.

In northern Europe and Scandinavia, a similar "trend" started in the early 1980s as café au lait became popular again, prepared with espresso and steamed milk. Caffè latte started replacing this term around 1996–97 but both names often exist side by side and generally are more similar than different in preparation.

Current use 
In Italy, caffè latte is almost always prepared at home, for breakfast only. This coffee beverage is brewed with a stovetop moka pot and poured into a cup containing heated milk. Unlike the "international" latte drink, generally, the milk in the Italian original is not foamed and sugar is added by the drinker, if at all.

In the USA, a latte is often heavily sweetened with 3% sugar (or even more). When wanting to order this beverage in Italy, one should ask for a latte macchiato.

The beverage is related to a cappuccino, the difference being that a cappuccino consists of espresso and steamed milk with a  layer of milk foam. A variant found in Australia and New Zealand that is similar to the latte is the flat white which is served in a smaller ceramic cup with warmed milk (without the layer of foam). In the United States this beverage is sometimes referred to as a wet cappuccino.

Iced latte 
In the United States, an iced latte is usually espresso and chilled milk poured over ice. Unlike a hot latte, it does not usually contain steamed milk or foam. Iced lattes often have sugar or flavoring syrups added, although purists prefer them to consist simply of coffee and milk; they also are served blended with ice. The espresso can be pre-chilled (sometimes as a mixture of espresso and milk) or frozen in advance to avoid warming up the drink.

Serving styles 

In some establishments, lattes are served in a glass on a saucer with a napkin to hold the (sometimes hot) glass.
Sometimes a latte is served in a bowl; in Europe, particularly Scandinavia, this is referred to as a café au lait.
Increasingly common in the United States and Europe, latte art has led to the stylization of coffee making, and the creation of which is now a popular art form. Created by pouring steaming, and mostly frothed, milk into the coffee, that liquid is introduced into the beverage in such a way that patterns are distinguishable on the top of coffee. Popular patterns can include hearts, flowers, trees, and other forms of simplistic representations of images and objects.
Often iced latte is served unstirred, so that coffee appears to "float" on top of white milk in a glass cup.
A Layered Latte reverses the traditional order of creating a Latte. Rather than pouring steamed milk into a shot of espresso, pouring hot espresso into a glass of steamed milk will create a combination of temperature and density that will cause the latte to split into multiple density layers. The science behind the Layered Latte is referred to as double-diffusive convection. To make the Layered Latte, pour a shot of espresso into a glass of steamed milk at the same temperature. The layering of the beverage is largely dependent on variables such as glass size as well as the ratio between milk and espresso.
A variation of the iced latte, known as the "bootleg latte", "ghetto latte", or "poor man's latte", is an iced espresso ordered in a larger than normal cup that will be filled up with free milk from the condiment station. The beverage has spawned debate at coffee shops where an iced espresso is considerably cheaper than an iced latte.
In South Asia, East Asia, and North America, local variants of teas have been combined with steamed or frothed milk to create "tea latte". Coffee and tea shops now offer hot or iced latte versions of masala chai, matcha, and Royal Milk Tea. An Earl Grey latte is known as a "London fog".
Other flavorings may be added to the latte to suit the taste of the drinker. Vanilla, chocolate, and caramel are all popular variants.
In South Africa a red latte is made with rooibos tea and has been known as a caffeine-free alternative to traditional tea or coffee-based latte.
An alternative version of latte may be prepared with soy milk or oat milk, as both have the ability to foam in the same way as cow milk, with soy milk versions being more prevalent. Such alternatives are popular among people with lactose intolerance and vegans.
The Sea Salt Latte, a famous variation of the traditional style latte made with a salted milk foam over an espresso-based coffee, was invented and popularized by Taiwanese international cafe chain 85C Bakery Cafe.

Politics 
Calling people "latte drinkers" pejoratively has become a common political attack in some Western cultures. The popularity of espresso drinking in large cities, especially among more affluent urban populations, has caused some to consider it elitist behavior. In the United States, conservative political commentators have been known to call their opponents "latte-drinking liberal elites". In Canadian politics, latte drinking is used to portray people as out-of-touch intellectuals and the antithesis of the Tim Hortons coffee drinker who is considered representative of an ordinary Canadian.

According to a 2018 study, 16% of liberals in the United States prefer lattes, whereas 9% of conservatives and 11% of moderates do. The study states further that the overwhelming majority of people, whether they are liberal, conservative, or moderate, express a preference for regular brewed coffee.

See also 

List of coffee drinks

References 

Italian drinks
Italian words and phrases
Espresso drinks
Coffee drinks

de:Milchkaffee